Keith-Albee Theatre is a performing arts center located along Fourth Avenue in downtown Huntington, West Virginia, United States. The Keith-Albee was named after the Keith-Albee-Orpheum Corporation, one of the leading vaudeville performance chains at that time, to convince the directors of Keith-Albee-Orpheum to make the Keith-Albee a regular stop. At the time of its construction, The Keith Albee was the second largest theater in the U.S. It is listed on the National Register of Historic Places as part of the Downtown Huntington Historic District, and is currently being restored as a performing arts center.

Early history
The Keith-Albee Theatre in downtown Huntington, West Virginia opened to the public on May 7, 1928. Brothers A. B. and S. J. Hyman built the Keith and added it to their list of theaters along with the State, Orpheum and Huntington.

The new theater was constructed under the supervision of vaudeville tycoons B. F. Keith and Edward Albee, becoming a part of their Keith-Albee circuit, the premier vaudeville tour on the East Coast of the United States.  The talented architect, Scottish-born Thomas W. Lamb designed the Keith-Albee. Lamb designed approximately 153 theaters around the world. Unfortunately, only forty-three of these grand theaters are still open, and seventy-one have been demolished. Keith and Albee oversaw the construction of two other Lamb-designed theaters at the same time as Huntington's Keith-Albee. The Stanley Theater in Utica, New York has been completely renovated and hosts a wide variety of performances. Keith's Theater in Flushing, New York sits barren and gutted, awaiting demolition. Seating approximately 3,000 patrons, it exemplified the opulence and grandeur of the 1920s with a Mexican Baroque design style. Intricate plasterwork, chandeliers, and balconies create an atmosphere of sophistication, along with cosmetic rooms, smoking rooms, and fireplaces for men and women in the restrooms adjoining the main lobby.
The Keith-Albee Theatre, which cost $2 million to construct in 1928, was dubbed a “temple of amusement” by Huntington's Herald-Dispatch newspaper. The opening day performance on May 8, 1928 featured performer Rae Samuels, nicknamed the “Blue Streak of Vaudeville” for her versatile acting ability. The theatre survived a major flood in 1937.

The Keith-Albee Theatre was equipped with a Wurlitzer organ to accompany live performances and motion pictures. The organ was capable of creating almost any sound effect needed for silent films shown in the theater. This original organ was removed and sold in the 1950s after live music had lost some of its appeal. However, as a result of significant effort by Huntington native Robert Edmunds and his Huntington Theatre Organ Project, Inc., a 1927 Wurlitzer organ was purchased and reinstalled in the Keith-Albee in 2001.
The Marshall Artists Series, was formed in 1936 and moved to the Keith-Albee in 1939. The Artists Series continues to bring a wide variety of entertainment to Huntington at the Keith-Albee including film festivals, Broadway shows, orchestras, and comedians. The Marshall Artists Series is a nonprofit organization based at Marshall University.
In the 1960s and 70's, the Keith-Albee and the Hyman family began to feel the impact of the growing television and motion picture industry. Faced with significant competition from surround sound multi-plexes springing up all over the country, the Hyman's opted to convert the main auditorium into a three screen movie theater. Two smaller theaters were constructed in the east and west sections of the main auditorium. A fourth theater, and also the smallest, was later added in a retail space facing Fourth Avenue. It is now the screening room.
In celebration of its 50th anniversary, the Keith-Albee featured a recreation of a vaudeville show starring famed singer Rudy Vallee. In 1988 the theater hosted a pre-screening benefit of the blockbuster movie Rainman. Actor Dustin Hoffman, as well as director Barry Levinson and producer Mark Johnson, traveled to Huntington and attended the benefit.
 
In January 2006, the Keith-Albee Theatre closed as a functioning movie theater and after almost 80 years of ownership, the Hyman family made the most generous donation of this local institution to the Marshall University Foundation, Inc. who in turn passed it on to the newly formed Keith-Albee Performing Arts Center Foundation.

The movie theatre and the present day
 
As vaudeville suffered a major decline in the 1930s, the Keith-Albee began to run movies. By the 1970s grand movie houses were being torn down to make way for larger cinemas. However, the citizens of Huntington chose to save the theatre from closure and the wrecking ball. The Hyman family decided to convert the grand Keith-Albee into three separate theatres. A fourth theatre was later added in a former retail space. In 1986, the Keith-Albee was placed on the Register of Historical Places in conjunction with several blocks of downtown Huntington. The Marshall University Foundation took a 99-year lease on the theatre back in 1990 and renovations were conducted in the 1990s. In 2004, a large cinema opened in Pullman Square, seriously damaging the Keith-Albee's business.  On January 22, 2006, the Keith-Albee stopped being an active movie theater. After a brief transfer to the Marshall University Foundation, Keith-Albee Performing Arts Center, Inc. has taken control of the theatre and will convert the Keith-Albee into a performing arts center. Throughout 2006, contractors and volunteers have worked to repair years of wear and to restore portions of the theatre to their original form. Along with many less visible projects, the partitions installed at the height of the theatre's days as a movie theatre were removed, reducing the three rooms to the original one. On December 12, 2006 the Keith-Albee hosted the world premiere of the movie We Are Marshall with actors Matthew McConaughey, Matthew Fox and director Joseph McGinty Nichol attending.  The theatre itself even makes a cameo appearance in the movie.

Today, KAPAC is in the midst of a $12 million Capital Campaign to continue the historic preservation and revitalization of the Keith-Albee Theatre. Its presence in the center of Downtown Huntington is valuable to community development, artistic enrichment and new programming for adults, students and children. KAPAC is also a member of the Washington, DC based National Trust for Historic Preservation.

References

External links
Keith-Albee.com

Buildings and structures in Huntington, West Virginia
Cinemas and movie theaters in West Virginia
1928 establishments in West Virginia
Music venues in West Virginia
Movie palaces
Tourist attractions in Cabell County, West Virginia
Theatres on the National Register of Historic Places in West Virginia
Historic district contributing properties in West Virginia
Theatres completed in 1928
National Register of Historic Places in Cabell County, West Virginia
Performing arts centers in West Virginia